San Perlita (Santa Perlita) is a city in Willacy County, Texas, United States. The population was 573 at the 2010 census. It may be included as part of the Brownsville–Harlingen–Raymondville and the Matamoros–Brownsville metropolitan areas.

Geography

San Perlita is located at  (26.500515, –97.643223).

According to the United States Census Bureau, the city has a total area of 0.5 square miles (1.3 km), all of it land.

Demographics

2020 census

As of the 2020 United States census, there were 538 people, 161 households, and 126 families residing in the city.

2000 census
As of the census of 2000, there were 680 people, 169 households, and 148 families residing in the city. The population density was 1,339.0 people per square mile (514.8/km). There were 188 housing units at an average density of 370.2 per square mile (142.3/km). The racial makeup of the city was 76.91% White, 2.21% African American, 0.59% Native American, 17.79% from other races, and 2.50% from two or more races.

There were 169 households, out of which 46.2% had children under the age of 18 living with them, 68.6% were married couples living together, 14.2% had a female householder with no husband present, and 12.4% were non-families. 10.1% of all households were made up of individuals, and 7.1% had someone living alone who was 65 years of age or older. The average household size was 4.02 and the average family size was 4.32.

In the city, the population was spread out, with 36.6% under the age of 18, 12.9% from 18 to 24, 25.1% from 25 to 44, 17.8% from 45 to 64, and 7.5% who were 65 years of age or older. The median age was 25 years. For every 100 females, there were 94.3 males. For every 100 females age 18 and over, there were 91.6 males.

The median income for a household in the city was $22,500, and the median income for a family was $23,542. Males had a median income of $19,236 versus $14,531 for females. The per capita income for the city was $6,761. About 31.3% of families and 39.5% of the population were below the poverty line, including 53.4% of those under age 18 and 32.7% of those age 65 or over.

Government and infrastructure
The United States Postal Service operates the San Perlita Post Office.

Education
San Perlita is served by the San Perlita Independent School District.

In addition, South Texas Independent School District operates magnet schools that serve the community.

References

External links

 Handbook of Texas Online article

Cities in Willacy County, Texas
Cities in Texas